The Baltimore Black Sox were a professional Negro league baseball team active between 1913 and 1936, based in Baltimore, Maryland.

Founding 

The Black Sox started as an independent team in 1913 by Howard Young.

Heyday 

In , The Black Sox boasted the "Million Dollar Infield" of Jud "Boojum" Wilson (first baseman),  Frank Warfield (second baseman), Oliver Marcell (third baseman) and Sir Richard Lundy (shortstop). The nickname was given to them by the media because of the prospective worth had they been white players. The Black Sox won over 70% of their games during the 1929 season and won the American Negro League Championship.

During their only season in the East–West League, the Black Sox were in third place with a 41–41 record when the league ceased operations.

Decline, demise and reincarnation 
In 1932, Joe Cambria became co-owner and general manager and moved the team into Cum Posey's new East–West League. During that same year, the team moved its home games to Bugle Field, which was owned by Cambria. He renovated and expanded the field and added lighting equipment for night games. The team was in first place in the East–West League in late June when the league disbanded and the teams stopped paying player salaries, instead splitting a percentage of the gate receipts with the players. In 1933, the team joined Gus Greenlee's new Negro National League. The next season, Cambria applied to reenter the Negro National League, but when several star players announced they would leave the team, his application was rejected and he disbanded the team.

In mid-season 1934, another team entered the league using the Black Sox name, but it didn't meet with much success and disbanded after only one year. Another Black Sox team led by Crush Holloway joined the short lived minor Negro American Association in 1939.

MLB throwback jersey 

On September 6, 2007, the Baltimore Orioles wore Black Sox uniforms in commemoration of the 75th anniversary of the Black Sox'  season.

On May 18, 2014 the Baltimore Orioles wore Black Sox uniforms as part of the Kansas City Royals's "Salute to the Negro Leagues".

References 
McKenna, Bernard. The Baltimore Black Sox: A Negro Leagues History, 1913-1936.  McFarland, 2020.

External links 
 1920 Baltimore Black Sox Calendar

African-American history in Baltimore
Negro league baseball teams
Sports teams in Baltimore
1916 establishments in Maryland
Defunct baseball teams in Maryland
Baseball teams disestablished in 1936
Baseball teams established in 1913